Columbus Public Schools is a school district headquartered in Columbus, Nebraska.

Schools
Secondary:
 Columbus High School
 Columbus Middle School

Primary:
 Centennial Elementary School
 Emerson Elementary School
 Lost Creek Elementary School
 North Park Elementary School
 West Park Elementary School

Preschool:
 Early Childhood

Other:
 EL Program

References

External links
 Columbus Public Schools
Education in Platte County, Nebraska
School districts in Nebraska